Kalinin District is an urban district of the city of Horlivka, Ukraine, named after a Soviet political figure Mikhail Kalinin.

Urban districts of Horlivka